The climate of Finland is influenced most by its latitude: Finland is located between 60 and 70 N. Because of Finland's northern location, winter is the longest season. Only on the south coast and in the southwest is summer as long as winter. On average, winter lasts from early January to late February in the outermost islands in the archipelago and the warmest locations along the southwestern coast – notably in Hanko – and from early October to mid May in the most elevated locations, such as northwestern Lapland and the lowest valleys in northeastern Lapland. This means that southern portions of the country are snow-covered about three to four months of the year, and the northern for about seven months. The long winter causes about half of the annual  precipitation in the north to fall as snow. Precipitation in the south amounts to about  annually. Like that of the north, it occurs all through the year, though not so much of it is snow.

In Köppen climate classification Finland belongs to the Df group (continental subarctic or boreal climates). The southern coast is Dfb (humid continental mild summer, wet all year), and the rest of the country is Dfc (subarctic with cool summer, wet all year).

The climate of Finland has characteristics of both maritime and continental climate. The Atlantic Ocean to the west and the Eurasian continent to the east interact to modify the climate of the country. The warm waters of the Gulf Stream and the North Atlantic Drift Current, which continuously warm the region, play a big role in the climate of Norway, Sweden and Finland; if it weren't for these currents, the winters in Scandinavia and Fennoscandia would be much colder. Westerly winds bring the warm air currents into the Baltic areas and to the country's shores, moderating winter temperatures, especially in the south and southwest in cities like Helsinki and Turku where winter highs tend to be between  but a cold snap like the one that occurred in mid-January 2016 can cause temperatures to plunge well below . These winds, because of clouds associated with weather systems accompanying the westerlies, also decrease the amount of sunshine received during the summer. By contrast, the continental high pressure system situated over the Eurasian continent counteracts the maritime influences, occasionally causing severe winters and high temperatures in the summer.

Temperature 
From there the temperature decreases gradually towards north and east. The Suomenselkä and Maanselkä drainage divides rise higher than the surrounding areas, and the climate there is cooler than at same latitudes elsewhere in Finland. The Barents Sea between Finland and the North Pole is open even in winter, so northerly airflows are not as cold as in Siberia or Alaska.
 
The lowest,  (Kittilä, January 28, 1999). The annual average temperature is relatively high in the southwestern part of the country, with quite mild winters and warm summers, and low in the northeastern part of Lapland (Finland).

Temperature extremes for every month:

Record highs and lows

Climate data

Wind 
The most common wind direction in Finland is from southwest, but the low pressure areas typical for these latitudes cause great variations in wind speed and direction.

Storm, defined as at least one Finnish coastal station reporting at least 21 m/s as a 10-minutes average wind speed, is observed on Finnish seas on average 19 days a year. Strong winds are most frequent between October and January.

Snow 
The first snow cover is observed on average in September in Lapland, and in November in Southern and western areas. Permanent snow cover time starts typically around Christmas in the Southwestern corner, but before mid-November in most of Lapland. The maximum snow depth is usually found around March.

Snow and supercooled droplets can accumulate in tree crowns and cause damage to trees. The trunks of pine trees can break under the weight of a snowloaded crown, and deciduous trees can bend permanently. The snowload of a tree is typically 100–150 kg per one meter tree trunk, but the heaviest measured snowload of a spruce was over 3000 kilograms.

Snowmelt contributes to spring floods. In north, the peak flow of rivers always happens in spring, in the south 70–80% of floods happen in spring. In the south, maximum flow happens in mid-April, in the north, in mid-May.

It is predicted that as the Barents Sea gets less frozen in the coming winters and it becomes thus "Atlantified" additional evaporation will increase future snowfalls in Finland and much of continental Europe.

References 

 
Geography of Finland
Finland